The 2007 Rally Ireland, the first Rally Ireland and fifteenth round of the 2007 World Rally Championship, was a motor rally run from 15 to 18 November. It took place over eight counties on both sides of the border between the Republic of Ireland and Northern Ireland. Event started in 
Stormont, Belfast and finished in Mullaghmore, County Sligo.

Report 
The rally began with the first special stage in front of Stormont Castle in Belfast, which Marcus Grönholm won on Thursday evening. The next day, in the fourth special stage, Grönholm hit a wall hard, and he and co-driver Timo Rautiainen were taken to hospital as a precaution. Both remained unhurt, but withdrew from the rally.

Citroën driver Sébastien Loeb took a step towards his fourth Drivers' World Championship title, taking the lead again in the drivers' standings. His advantage over his rival Grönholm, who retired on Friday after a serious accident, had been six points before the last round of the world championship. Mikko Hirvonen finished fourth, securing the second manufacturers' world championship title in a row for the Ford team.

Jari-Matti Latvala was third, taking his first WRC podium. Latvala edged out Hirvonen from third place on Friday. He was able to hold this position to the finish despite briefly going off the road on Saturday, losing a little time.

Results

Retirements 

  Eugene Donnelly - mechanical (SS4);
  Marcus Grönholm - went off the road - hit the wall (SS4);
  Xavier Pons - mechanical - engine (SS4);
  Andreas Aigner - went off the road (SS7);
  Kris Meeke - mechanical (SS9);
  Andrew Nesbitt - went off the road (SS11);
  Gareth Jones - mechanical (SS11);
  Ray Breen - went off the road (SS11);
  Tim McNulty - mechanical (SS12);
  Manfred Stohl - mechanical (SS13);
  Mark Higgins - rolled (SS16) ;
  Leszek Kuzaj - mechanical (SS16);
  Patrik Flodin - mechanical (SS17);
  Armindo Araújo - went off the road (SS19);

Special Stages 
All dates and times are GMT (UTC).

Championship standings after the event

Drivers' championship

Manufacturers' championship

References

External links 

 Results on the official site: WRC.com
 Stage Time List on rallyireland.org
 Results on eWRC.com
 Results at Jonkka's World Rally Archive

Ireland
Rally Ireland
Rally Ireland
Rally Ireland